James Andrew Antcliff (born 8 April 1993) is a singer whose name was changed to James Cherry after his father left the family home. Born in Leicester, Leicestershire, England, he has been writing songs since he was 13.

His music is described as ‘aggressive soul’.

First played by Dean Jackson on BBC Introducing East Midlands in June 2015, his track "Cry Myself To Sleep", taken from his self released debut EP, "Blame It On Our Youth", was soon crowned 'Track Of The Day' by Clash magazine, and picked up by Huw Stephens and Annie Mac on BBC Radio 1 amongst others.

Discography

EPs

References

1993 births
Living people
21st-century British singers
21st-century British male singers